Systata is a genus of picture-winged flies in the family Ulidiidae.

Species
 S. angustata
 S. obliqua
 S. silvicola

References

Ulidiidae